Doncaster was a rural district in the West Riding of Yorkshire, England from 1894 to 1974. 

The rural district was created by the Local Government Act 1894 as successor to the Doncaster Rural Sanitary District. It consisted of an area surrounding, but not including, the town of Doncaster. Doncaster itself formed a separate municipal borough (from 1927 a county borough). The district underwent a number of boundary changes over its existence due to the expansion of Doncaster and the growth of a number of other towns.

Doncaster Rural District Council were granted armorial bearings on 30 October 1947.

Civil parishes
Over its existence the rural district consisted of the following  civil parishes:

Abolition
On 1 April 1974 the Local Government Act 1972 came into effect, reorganising administrative areas throughout England and Wales. The rural district was abolished, and its area merged with the County Borough of Doncaster and a number of other districts to form the Metropolitan Borough of Doncaster, part of the metropolitan county of South Yorkshire.

References

Politics of Doncaster
History of South Yorkshire
Rural districts of the West Riding of Yorkshire